Richmond—Wolfe (also known as Richmond) was a federal electoral district in Quebec, Canada, that was represented in the House of Commons of Canada from 1867 to 1997.

It was created as by the British North America Act, 1867.

It was abolished in 1966 when it was redistributed into Richmond and Drummond ridings.

Richmond riding was renamed "Richmond—Wolfe" in 1980.

In 1996, it was again abolished when it was redistributed into the new districts of Richmond—Arthabaska and Compton—Stanstead.

Members of Parliament

This riding elected the following Members of Parliament:

Election results

Richmond—Wolfe, 1867–1968

Richmond, 1968–1980

Richmond—Wolfe, 1980–1997

See also 

 List of Canadian federal electoral districts
 Past Canadian electoral districts

External links

Riding history from the Library of Parliament:
Richmond-Wolfe 1867-1966
Richmond 1966-1980
Richmond-Wolfe 1980-1996

Former federal electoral districts of Quebec